Polyvinyl chloride (alternatively: poly(vinyl chloride), colloquial: polyvinyl, or simply vinyl; abbreviated: PVC) is the world's third-most widely produced synthetic polymer of plastic (after polyethylene and polypropylene). About 40 million tons of PVC are produced each year.

PVC comes in two basic forms: rigid (sometimes abbreviated as RPVC) and flexible. The rigid form of PVC is used in construction for pipe and in profile applications such as doors and windows. It is also used in making plastic bottles, non-food packaging, food-covering sheets and plastic cards (such as bank or membership cards). It can be made softer and more flexible by the addition of plasticizers, the most widely used being phthalates. In this form, it is also used in plumbing, electrical cable insulation, imitation leather, flooring, signage, phonograph records, inflatable products, and many applications where it replaces rubber. With cotton or linen, it is used in the production of canvas.

Pure polyvinyl chloride is a white, brittle solid. It is insoluble in alcohol but slightly soluble in tetrahydrofuran.

Discovery
PVC was synthesized in 1872 by German chemist Eugen Baumann after extended investigation and experimentation. The polymer appeared as a white solid inside a flask of vinyl chloride that had been left on a shelf sheltered from sunlight for four weeks. In the early 20th century, the Russian chemist Ivan Ostromislensky and Fritz Klatte of the German chemical company Griesheim-Elektron both attempted to use PVC in commercial products, but difficulties in processing the rigid, sometimes brittle polymer thwarted their efforts. Waldo Semon and the B.F. Goodrich Company developed a method in 1926 to plasticize PVC by blending it with various additives, including the use of dibutyl phthalate by 1933.

Production
Polyvinyl chloride is produced by polymerization of the vinyl chloride monomer (VCM), as shown.

About 80% of production involves suspension polymerization. Emulsion polymerization accounts for about 12%, and bulk polymerization accounts for 8%. Suspension polymerization affords particles with average diameters of 100–180 μm, whereas emulsion polymerization gives much smaller particles of average size around 0.2 μm. VCM and water are introduced into the reactor along with a polymerization initiator and other additives. The contents of the reaction vessel are pressurized and continually mixed to maintain the suspension and ensure a uniform particle size of the PVC resin. The reaction is exothermic and thus requires cooling. As the volume is reduced during the reaction (PVC is denser than VCM), water is continually added to the mixture to maintain the suspension.

PVC may be manufactured from either naphtha or ethylene feedstock.

Microstructure
The polymers are linear and are strong. The monomers are mainly arranged head-to-tail, meaning that there are chlorides on alternating carbon centres. PVC has mainly an atactic stereochemistry, which means that the relative stereochemistry of the chloride centres are random.  Some degree of syndiotacticity of the chain gives a few percent crystallinity that is influential on the properties of the material.  About 57% of the mass of PVC is chlorine. The presence of chloride groups gives the polymer very different properties from the structurally related material polyethylene. The density is also higher than for these structurally related plastics.

Producers 
About half of the world's PVC production capacity is in China, despite the closure of many Chinese PVC plants due to issues complying with environmental regulations and poor capacities of scale. The largest single producer of PVC as of 2018 is Shin-Etsu Chemical of Japan, with a global share of around 30%.

Additives
The product of the polymerization process is unmodified PVC. Before PVC can be made into finished products, it always requires conversion into a compound by the incorporation of additives (but not necessarily all of the following) such as heat stabilizers, UV stabilizers, plasticizers, processing aids, impact modifiers, thermal modifiers, fillers, flame retardants, biocides, blowing agents and smoke suppressors, and, optionally, pigments. The choice of additives used for the PVC finished product is controlled by the cost performance requirements of the end use specification (underground pipe, window frames, intravenous tubing and flooring all have very different ingredients to suit their performance requirements). Previously, polychlorinated biphenyls (PCBs) were added to certain PVC products as flame retardants and stabilizers.

Plasticizers

Among the common plastics, PVC is unique in its acceptance of large amounts of plasticizer with gradual changes in physical properties from a rigid solid to a soft gel, and almost 90% of all plasticizer production is used in making flexible PVC. The majority is used in films and cable sheathing. Flexible PVC can consist of over 85% plasticizer by mass, however unplasticized PVC (UPVC) should not contain any.

A wide variety of substances can be used as plasticizers including phthalates, organophosphates, adipates, trimellitates, polymeric plasticizers and epoxidized vegetable oils.

Phthalates

The most common class of plasticizers used in PVC is phthalates, which are diesters of phthalic acid.  Phthalates can be categorized as high and low, depending on their molecular weight. Low phthalates such as DEHP and DBP have increased health risks and are generally being phased out.  High-molecular-weight phthalates such as DINP, DIDP are generally considered safer

While di-2-ethylhexylphthalate (DEHP) has been medically approved for many years for use in medical devices, it was permanently banned for use in children's products in the US in 2008 by US Congress; the PVC-DEHP combination had proved to be very suitable for making blood bags because DEHP stabilizes red blood cells, minimizing hemolysis (red blood cell rupture). However, DEHP is coming under increasing pressure in Europe. The assessment of potential risks related to phthalates, and in particular the use of DEHP in PVC medical devices, was subject to scientific and policy review by the European Union authorities, and on 21 March 2010, a specific labeling requirement was introduced across the EU for all devices containing phthalates that are classified as CMR (carcinogenic, mutagenic or toxic to reproduction). The label aims to enable healthcare professionals to use this equipment safely, and, where needed, take appropriate precautionary measures for patients at risk of over-exposure

Metal stabilizers
BaZn stabilisers have successfully replaced cadmium-based stabilisers in Europe in many PVC semi-rigid and flexible applications.

In Europe, particularly Belgium, there has been a commitment to eliminate the use of cadmium (previously used as a part component of heat stabilizers in window profiles) and phase out lead-based heat stabilizers (as used in pipe and profile areas) such as liquid autodiachromate and calcium polyhydrocummate by 2015. According to the final report of Vinyl 2010, cadmium was eliminated across Europe by 2007. The progressive substitution of lead-based stabilizers is also confirmed in the same document showing a reduction of 75% since 2000 and ongoing. This is confirmed by the corresponding growth in calcium-based stabilizers, used as an alternative to lead-based stabilizers, more and more, also outside Europe.

Heat stabilizers
Some of the most crucial additives are heat stabilizers.  These agents minimize loss of HCl, a degradation process that starts above 70 °C (158 °F).  Once dehydrochlorination starts, it is autocatalytic.  Many diverse agents have been used including, traditionally, derivatives of heavy metals (lead, cadmium).  Metallic soaps (metal "salts" of fatty acids) are common in flexible PVC applications, species such as calcium stearate.

Properties
PVC is a thermoplastic polymer. Its properties are usually categorized based on rigid and flexible PVCs.

Notes

Thermal and fire
The heat stability of raw PVC is very poor, so the addition of a heat stabilizer during the process is necessary in order to ensure the product's properties. Traditional product PVC has a maximum operating temperature around 60 °C (140 °F) when heat distortion begins to occur.

As a thermoplastic, PVC has an inherent insulation that aids in reducing condensation formation and resisting internal temperature changes for hot and cold liquids.

Applications

Pipes
Roughly half of the world's PVC resin manufactured annually is used for producing pipes for municipal and industrial applications. In the private homeowner market, it accounts for 66% of the household market in the US, and in household sanitary sewer pipe applications, it accounts for 75%. Buried PVC pipes in both water and sanitary sewer applications that are 100 mm (4 in) in diameter and larger are typically joined by means of a gasket-sealed joint.  The most common type of gasket utilized in North America is a metal-reinforced elastomer, commonly referred to as a Rieber sealing system.

Electric cables
In a fire, PVC-coated wires can form hydrogen chloride fumes; the chlorine serves to scavenge free radicals and is the source of the material's fire retardancy. While hydrogen chloride fumes can also pose a health hazard in their own right, it dissolves in moisture and breaks down onto surfaces, particularly in areas where the air is cool enough to breathe, and is not available for inhalation.

Construction

Unplasticised PVC (uPVC, almost synonymous with rigid PVC) is extensively used in the building industry as a low-maintenance material, particularly in Ireland, the United Kingdom, the United States, and Canada. In the US and Canada, it is known as vinyl or vinyl siding. The material comes in a range of colors and finishes, including a photo-effect wood finish, and is used as a substitute for painted wood, mostly for window frames and sills when installing insulated glazing in new buildings; or to replace older single-glazed windows, as it does not decompose and is weather-resistant. Other uses include fascia, and siding or weatherboarding. This material has almost entirely replaced the use of cast iron for plumbing and drainage, being used for waste pipes, drainpipes, gutters and downspouts. uPVC is known as having strong resistance against chemicals, sunlight, and oxidation from water.

Signs
Polyvinyl chloride is formed in flat sheets in a variety of thicknesses and colors. As flat sheets, PVC is often expanded to create voids in the interior of the material, providing additional thickness without additional weight and minimal extra cost (see closed-cell PVC foamboard). Sheets are cut using saws and rotary cutting equipment. Plasticized PVC is also used to produce thin, colored, or clear, adhesive-backed films referred to simply as vinyl. These films are typically cut on a computer-controlled plotter (see vinyl cutter) or printed in a wide-format printer. These sheets and films are used to produce a wide variety of commercial signage products, including car body stripes and stickers.

Clothing 

PVC fabric is water-resistant, used for its weather-resistant qualities in coats, skiing equipment, shoes, jackets, aprons, and patches. 

The two main application areas for single-use medically approved PVC compounds are flexible containers and tubing: containers used for blood and blood components, for urine collection or for ostomy products and tubing used for blood taking and blood giving sets, catheters, heart-lung bypass sets, hemodialysis sets etc. In Europe the consumption of PVC for medical devices is approximately 85,000 tons each year. Almost one third of plastic-based medical devices are made from PVC.

Wire rope 
PVC may be extruded under pressure to encase wire rope and aircraft cable used for general purpose applications. PVC coated wire rope is easier to handle, resists corrosion and abrasion, and may be color-coded for increased visibility. It is found in a variety of industries and environments both indoor and out.

Other uses 

PVC piping is cheaper than metals used in musical instrument making; it is therefore a common alternative when making instruments, often for leisure or for rarer instruments such as the contrabass flute. An instrument that is almost exclusively built from PVC tube is the thongophone, a percussion instrument that is played by slapping the open tubes with a flip-flop or similar.

Chlorinated PVC

PVC can be usefully modified by chlorination, which increases its chlorine content to or above 67%. Chlorinated polyvinyl chloride, (CPVC), as it is called, is produced by chlorination of aqueous solution of suspension PVC particles followed by exposure to UV light which initiates the free-radical chlorination.

Health and safety

Degradation
The fungus Aspergillus fumigatus degrades plasticized PVC. Phanerochaete chrysosporium was grown on PVC in a mineral salt agar. Phanerochaete chrysosporium, Lentinus tigrinus, Aspergillus niger, and Aspergillus sydowii can effectively degrade PVC.

Plasticizers
Phthalates, which are incorporated into plastics as plasticizers, comprise approximately 70% of the US plasticizer market; phthalates are by design not covalently bound to the polymer matrix, which makes them highly susceptible to leaching. Phthalates are contained in plastics at high percentages. For example, they can contribute up to 40% by weight to intravenous medical bags and up to 80% by weight in medical tubing. Vinyl products are pervasive—including toys, car interiors, shower curtains, and flooring—and initially release chemical gases into the air. Some studies indicate that this outgassing of additives may contribute to health complications, and have resulted in a call for banning the use of DEHP on shower curtains, among other uses. 

In 2004 a joint Swedish-Danish research team found a statistical association between allergies in children and indoor air levels of DEHP and BBzP (butyl benzyl phthalate), which is used in vinyl flooring. In December 2006, the European Chemicals Bureau of the European Commission released a final draft risk assessment of BBzP which found "no concern" for consumer exposure including exposure to children.

Lead
Lead had previously been frequently added to PVC to improve workability and stability.  Lead has been shown to leach into drinking water from PVC pipes.

In Europe the use of lead-based stabilizers was gradually replaced. The VinylPlus voluntary commitment which began in 2000, saw European Stabiliser Producers Association (ESPA) members complete the replacement of Pb-based stabilisers in 2015.

Vinyl chloride monomer

In the early 1970s, the carcinogenicity of vinyl chloride (usually called vinyl chloride monomer or VCM) was linked to cancers in workers in the polyvinyl chloride industry. Specifically workers in polymerization section of a B.F. Goodrich plant near Louisville, Kentucky, were diagnosed with liver angiosarcoma also known as hemangiosarcoma, a rare disease. Since that time, studies of PVC workers in Australia, Italy, Germany, and the UK have all associated certain types of occupational cancers with exposure to vinyl chloride, and it has become accepted that VCM is a carcinogen.

Dioxins

PVC produces HCl upon combustion almost quantitatively related to its chlorine content. Extensive studies in Europe indicate that the chlorine found in emitted dioxins is not derived from HCl in the flue gases. Instead, most dioxins arise in the condensed solid phase by the reaction of inorganic chlorides with graphitic structures in char-containing ash particles. Copper acts as a catalyst for these reactions.

Studies of household waste burning indicate consistent increases in dioxin generation with increasing PVC concentrations. According to the EPA dioxin inventory, landfill fires are likely to represent an even larger source of dioxin to the environment. A survey of international studies consistently identifies high dioxin concentrations in areas affected by open waste burning and a study that looked at the homologue pattern found the sample with the highest dioxin concentration was "typical for the pyrolysis of PVC". Other EU studies indicate that PVC likely "accounts for the overwhelming majority of chlorine that is available for dioxin formation during landfill fires."

The next largest sources of dioxin in the EPA inventory are medical and municipal waste incinerators. Various studies have been conducted that reach contradictory results. For instance a study of commercial-scale incinerators showed no relationship between the PVC content of the waste and dioxin emissions. Other studies have shown a clear correlation between dioxin formation and chloride content and indicate that PVC is a significant contributor to the formation of both dioxin and PCB in incinerators.

In February 2007, the Technical and Scientific Advisory Committee of the US Green Building Council (USGBC) released its report on a PVC avoidance related materials credit for the LEED Green Building Rating system. The report concludes that "no single material shows up as the best across all the human health and environmental impact categories, nor as the worst" but that the "risk of dioxin emissions puts PVC consistently among the worst materials for human health impacts."

In Europe the overwhelming importance of combustion conditions on dioxin formation has been established by numerous researchers. The single most important factor in forming dioxin-like compounds is the temperature of the combustion gases. Oxygen concentration also plays a major role on dioxin formation, but not the chlorine content.

Several studies have also shown that removing PVC from waste would not significantly reduce the quantity of dioxins emitted. The EU Commission published in July 2000 a Green Paper on the Environmental Issues of PVC" 

A study commissioned by the European Commission on "Life Cycle Assessment of PVC and of principal competing materials" states that "Recent studies show that the presence of PVC has no significant effect on the amount of dioxins released through incineration of plastic waste."

End-of-life
The European waste hierarchy refers to the five steps included in the article 4 of the Waste Framework Directive:

 Prevention: preventing and reducing waste generation.
 Reuse and preparation for reuse: giving the products a second life before they become waste.
 Recycle: any recovery operation by which waste materials are reprocessed into products, materials or substances whether for the original or other purposes. It includes composting and it does not include incineration.
 Recovery: some waste incineration based on a political non-scientific formula.

Industry initiatives
In Europe, developments in PVC waste management have been monitored by Vinyl 2010, established in 2000. Vinyl 2010's objective was to recycle 200,000 tonnes of post-consumer PVC waste per year in Europe by the end of 2010, excluding waste streams already subject to other or more specific legislation (such as the European Directives on End-of-Life Vehicles, Packaging and Waste Electric and Electronic Equipment).

Since June 2011, it is followed by VinylPlus, a new set of targets for sustainable development. Its main target is to recycle 800,000 tonnes per year of PVC by 2020 including 100,000 tonnes of "difficult to recycle" waste. One facilitator for collection and recycling of PVC waste is Recovinyl. The reported and audited mechanically recycled PVC tonnage in 2016 was 568,695 tonnes which in 2018 had increased to 739,525 tonnes.

One approach to address the problem of waste PVC is also through the process called Vinyloop. It is a mechanical recycling process using a solvent to separate PVC from other materials. This solvent turns in a closed loop process in which the solvent is recycled. Recycled PVC is used in place of virgin PVC in various applications: coatings for swimming pools, shoe soles, hoses, diaphragms tunnel, coated fabrics, PVC sheets. This recycled PVC's primary energy demand is 46 percent lower than conventional produced PVC. So the use of recycled material leads to a significant better ecological footprint. The global warming potential is 39 percent lower.

Restrictions
In November 2005 one of the largest hospital networks in the US, Catholic Healthcare West, signed a contract with B. Braun Melsungen for vinyl-free intravenous bags and tubing.

In January 2012 a major US West Coast healthcare provider, Kaiser Permanente, announced that it will no longer buy intravenous (IV) medical equipment made with PVC and DEHP-type plasticizers.

In 1998, the US Consumer Product Safety Commission (CPSC) arrived at a voluntary agreement with manufacturers to remove phthalates from PVC rattles, teethers, baby bottle nipples and pacifiers.

Vinyl gloves in medicine

Plasticized PVC is a common material for medical gloves. Due to vinyl gloves having less flexibility and elasticity, several guidelines recommend either latex or nitrile gloves for clinical care and procedures that require manual dexterity and/or that involve patient contact for more than a brief period. Vinyl gloves show poor resistance to many chemicals, including glutaraldehyde-based products and alcohols used in formulation of disinfectants for swabbing down work surfaces or in hand rubs. The additives in PVC are also known to cause skin reactions such as allergic contact dermatitis. These are for example the antioxidant bisphenol A, the biocide benzisothiazolinone, propylene glycol/adipate polyester and ethylhexylmaleate.

Sustainability
PVC is made from fossil fuels, including natural gas. The production process also uses sodium chloride which results in a polymer containing 57% chloride content. Recycled PVC is broken down into small chips, impurities removed, and the product refined to make pure PVC.

In Europe, a 2021 VinylPlus Progress Report indicated that 731,461 tonnes PVC were recycled in 2020, a 5% reduction compared to 2019 due to the COVID-19 pandemic. The report also covers all five sustainability challenges that the sector has set for itself covering controlled loop management, organochlorine emissions, sustainable use of additives, sustainable use of energy and raw materials and sustainability awareness.

There is also a continuing focus on the role that the polymer plays in meeting the Circular Economy model and contribution to Sustainable Development Goals. The Olympic Delivery Authority (ODA), for example, after initially rejecting PVC as material for different temporary venues of the London Olympics 2012, has reviewed its decision and developed a policy for its use. This policy highlighted that the functional properties of PVC make it the most appropriate material in certain circumstances while taking into consideration the environmental and social impacts across the whole life cycle, e.g. the rate for recycling or reuse and the percentage of recycled content. Temporary parts, like roofing covers of the Olympic Stadium, the Water Polo Arena, and the Royal Artillery Barracks, would be deconstructed and a part recycled in the VinyLoop process.

See also

 Chloropolymers
 Plastic pressure pipe systems
 Plastic recycling
 Polyethylene
 Polypropylene
 Polymer clay
 Polyvinyl fluoride
 Polyvinylidene chloride
 Polyvinylidene fluoride
 PVC clothing
 PVC decking
 PVC fetishism
 Vinyl roof membrane

References

General references

Inline citations

External links

 The European PVC Portal (European Council of Vinyl Manufacturers)
 Polyvinyl Chloride International Chemical Safety Cards—CDC/NIOSH
 The Vinyl Council of Canada
 US Vinyl Institute
 

Dielectrics
Nonwoven fabrics
Plastics
Thermoplastics
Vinyl polymers
Commodity chemicals
1872 in science
1872 in Germany